The Copa Chile 1992 was the 22nd edition of the Chilean Cup tournament. The competition started on February 29, 1992, and concluded on June 18, 1992. U. Española won the competition for their second time, beating Colo-Colo 3–1 on the final. 
The points system used in the first round of the tournament was; 2 points for the winner but, if the winner team scores 4 or more goals, they won 3 points; in case of a tie, every team took 1 point but, no points for each team if the score were 0–0.

Calendar

Group Round

Group 1

Group 2

Group 3

Intergroup scores (groups 3-4)

Group 4

Group 5

Intergroup scores (groups 5-6)

Group 6

Round of 16

|}

Quarterfinals

|}

Semifinals

Final

Top goalscorer
Marcelo Vega (U. Española) 13 goals

See also
 1992 Campeonato Nacional
 Primera B

References
Revista Triunfo, La Nación (Santiago, Chile) March–June 1992 (revised scores & information)
RSSSF

Copa Chile
Chile
1992